The 1935 PGA Championship was the 18th PGA Championship, held October 17–23 at Twin Hills Golf & Country Club in Oklahoma City, Oklahoma.  Then a match play championship, Johnny Revolta won his only major title, defeating Tommy Armour 5 & 4.

The match play field was increased in 1935 to 64 players, with the first two rounds at 18 holes each, played on the first day, Friday. Weather caused a one-day delay in the schedule and the finals were held on Wednesday.

Defending champion Paul Runyan lost 3 & 2 in the quarterfinals to Al Zimmerman of Portland, Oregon. Five-time champion Walter Hagen, age 42, was the medalist in qualifying with 139 (−1), but lost in the first round to Revolta, 1 up.

Format
The match play format at the PGA Championship in 1935 called for 12 rounds (216 holes) in six days:
 Thursday – 36-hole stroke play qualifier (continued on Friday)
defending champion Paul Runyan and top 63 professionals advanced to match play
 Friday – first two rounds, 18 holes each (continued on Saturday)
 Saturday – third round – 36 holes (played on Sunday)
 Sunday – quarterfinals – 36 holes (played on Monday)
 Monday – semifinals – 36 holes (played on Tuesday)
 Tuesday – final – 36 holes (played on Wednesday)

Past champions in the field

Failed to qualify

Source:

Final results
Wednesday, October 23, 1935

Final eight bracket

Final match scorecards
Morning

Afternoon

Source:

References

External links
PGA Media Guide 2012
PGA.com – 1935 PGA Championship

PGA Championship
Golf in Oklahoma
Sports competitions in Oklahoma City
PGA Championship
PGA Championship
PGA Championship
PGA Championship